Buccheri is a town and comune in the Province of Syracuse, Sicily (southern Italy).

References

Municipalities of the Province of Syracuse